Bethge is a German surname. Notable people with the surname include:

Ansgar Bethge (1924–2008), German admiral
Eberhard Bethge (1909–2000), German Lutheran theologian
Friedrich Bethge (1891–1963), German poet, playwright and dramatist
Hans Bethge (disambiguation), multiple people
Raimund Bethge (born 1947), East German bobsledder

German-language surnames